Chubra Peak is the peak rising to 1541 m east of Temple Glacier and south of Kasabova Glacier in Korten Ridge on Davis Coast in Graham Land, Antarctic.

The peak is named after the settlement of Chubra in eastern Bulgaria.

Location
German-British mapping in 1996.

Map
 Trinity Peninsula. Scale 1:250000 topographic map No. 5697. Institut für Angewandte Geodäsie and British Antarctic Survey, 1996.

Notes

References
 Bulgarian Antarctic Gazetteer. Antarctic Place-names Commission. (details in Bulgarian, basic data in English)
 SCAR Composite Antarctic Gazetteer.

External links
 Chubra Peak. Copernix satellite image

Mountains of Graham Land
Bulgaria and the Antarctic
Davis Coast